Max Lehrs (24 June 1855, in Berlin – 12 November 1938, in Dresden) was a German art historian and long-time director of the Dresden Kupferstichskabinett, 1896–1904, and 1908–24, with the intervening as director in Berlin. He is especially noted for his work on 15th-century German and Dutch engravers, and the numbers from his catalogues are still the most commonly used in modern references for many artists.  Lehrs went blind while still writing his works, which were completed with the help of his daughter and his memory, leading to some lapses in late works.

Further reading 
 
 Peter Betthausen, Peter H. Feist, Christiane Fork: Metzler-Kunsthistoriker-Lexikon. Zweihundert Porträts deutschsprachiger Autoren aus vier Jahrhunderten. Metzler, Stuttgart 1999,

External links 
 Entry for Max Lehrs on the Dictionary of Art Historians
 Engraving and etching: a handbook for the use of students and print collectors. - full text on Google Books
 Geschichte und kritischer Katalog des deutschen, niederländischen und französischen Kupferstichs im XV. Jahrhundert - full text on Google Books
 

1855 births
1938 deaths
Writers from Berlin
German art historians
Printmaking
German male non-fiction writers